Burgos, officially the Municipality of Burgos is a 4th class municipality in the province of Ilocos Sur, Philippines. According to the 2020 census, it has a population of 12,793 people.

Etymology
The town got its name in honor of Father José Burgos during the Spanish era.

History
Burgos came into existence in 1831 when Father Bernardino Logo was able to convert many natives into the folds of Christianity.  The resulting town became Nueva Coveta.  It was envied by its neighbors because of its peace and order, as well as its progress, since it sold its resulting products in places as far as Pangasinan and Tarlac.

Burgos became a township of Santa Maria in the latter period of Ilocos Sur's Spanish era. It was later named in honor of Father José Burgos.

Geography

Barangays
Burgos is politically subdivided into 26 barangays, or neighborhoods. These barangays are headed by elected officials: Barangay Captain, Barangay Council, whose members are called Barangay Councilors. All are elected every three years.

Climate

Demographics

In the 2020 census, Burgos had a population of 12,793.

Economy

Government
Burgos, belonging to the second congressional district of the province of Ilocos Sur, is governed by a mayor designated as its local chief executive and by a municipal council as its legislative body in accordance with the Local Government Code. The mayor, vice mayor, and the councilors are elected directly by the people through an election which is being held every three years.

Elected officials

References

External links
Pasyalang Ilocos Sur
Philippine Standard Geographic Code
Philippine Census Information
Local Governance Performance Management System

Municipalities of Ilocos Sur